Wolf Run is a stream in the U.S. state of West Virginia. It is a tributary to the Tygart Valley River.

Wolf Run was named from an incident when a hunter shot a wolf near its course.

References

Rivers of West Virginia
Rivers of Barbour County, West Virginia